The athletics competition at the 1990 Asian Games was held at the Olympic Sports Centre in Beijing, China from 27 September to 3 October.

Some English-language sources, such as GBR Athletics, erroneously state that Kim Bok-joo was winner of the men's 800 m and the 1500 m silver medallist. Contemporary English and Korean sources indicate it was his similarly-named teammate Kim Bong-yoo who achieved these feats.

Medalists

Men

Women

Medal table

References

Medalists
Asian Games Results. GBR Athletics. Retrieved on 2014-10-04.
Women's relay medallists. Incheon2014. Retrieved on 2014-10-04.
Men's relay medallists. Incheon2014. Retrieved on 2014-10-04.

 
1990 Asian Games events
1990
Asian Games
1990 Asian Games
Asian Games